Dorcadion wagneri is a species of beetle in the family Cerambycidae. It was described by Küster in 1846. It is known from Turkey, Iran, and Armenia.

References

wagneri
Beetles described in 1846